The overjustification effect occurs when an expected external incentive such as money or prizes decreases a person's intrinsic motivation to perform a task. Overjustification is an explanation for the phenomenon known as motivational "crowding out". The overall effect of offering a reward for a previously unrewarded activity is a shift to extrinsic motivation and the undermining of pre-existing intrinsic motivation. Once rewards are no longer offered, interest in the activity is lost; prior intrinsic motivation does not return, and extrinsic rewards must be continuously offered as motivation to sustain the activity.

Experimental evidence
The overjustification effect has been widely demonstrated in many settings. In one of the earliest demonstrations of this effect, Edward Deci and his colleagues conducted a laboratory experiment in 1971 where subjects showing baseline interest in solving a puzzle were exposed to two different conditions. The control group were not paid on all three days while the experimental group were not paid on the first day, were paid on the second day and were not paid again on the third day. The subjects were given a break in the middle of each session and were being observed while doing whatever they wanted. The results showed that the experimental group spent significantly more time than the control group playing the puzzle during their break time on day 2 when they were paid but significantly less on day 3 when they were not paid. This was interpreted as evidence that the extrinsic monetary reward significantly reduced their intrinsic motivation to engage in the task.

Researchers at Southern Methodist University conducted an experiment on 188 female university students in which they measured the subjects' continued interest in a cognitive task (a word game) after their initial performance under different incentives. The subjects were divided into two groups. Members of the first group were told that they would be rewarded for competence. Above-average players would be paid more and below-average players would be paid less. Members of the second group were told that they would be rewarded only for completion. Their pay was scaled by the number of repetitions or the number of hours playing. Afterwards, half of the subjects in each group were told that they over-performed, and the other half were told that they under-performed, regardless of how well each subject actually did. Members of the first group generally showed greater interest in the game and continued playing for a longer time than the members of the second group. "Over-performers" continued playing longer than "under-performers" in the first group, but "under-performers" continued playing longer than "over-performers" in the second group. This study showed that, when rewards do not reflect competence, higher rewards lead to less intrinsic motivation. But when rewards do reflect competence, higher rewards lead to greater intrinsic motivation.

Richard Titmuss suggested that paying for blood donations might reduce the supply of blood donors. To test this, a field experiment with three treatments was conducted. In the first treatment, the donors did not receive compensation. In the second treatment, the donors received a small payment. In the third treatment, donors were given a choice between the payment and an equivalent-valued contribution to charity. None of the three treatments affected the number of male donors, but the second treatment almost halved the number of female donors. However, allowing the contribution to charity fully eliminated this effect.

Theories
According to self-perception theory, a person infers causes about his or her own behavior based on external constraints. The presence of a strong constraint (such as a reward) would lead a person to conclude that he or she is performing the behavior solely for the reward, which shifts the person's motivation from intrinsic to extrinsic.

Laboratory studies in the 1970s indicated that individuals under conditions with extrinsic rewards showed diminished intrinsic motivation. Deci and his colleagues (e.g., Deci and Ryan 1985) developed the cognitive evaluation theory to explain the results. As a sub-theory of self-determination theory, cognitive evaluation theory explains that both control and competence underlie intrinsic motivation and how extrinsic rewards affect intrinsic motivation is dependent on the individual's interpretation. Intrinsic motivation increases if individuals interpret rewards as pertaining positive information about their own competence and self-control over results, whereas if they interpret the results as indicative of external control, this decreases their feelings of self-control and competence, which in turn decreases intrinsic motivation. Cognitive evaluation theory also suggests social context as another implication on intrinsic motivation. Social cues can exert either positive or negative effects on intrinsic motivation depending on the messages that the context conveys regarding a person's autonomy and competence. Verbal rewards such as positive feedback and praise are predicted to be experienced as controlling hence decreasing intrinsic motivation. However, verbal rewards that are informational and not experienced as controlling are predicted to exert positive effects.

Self-determination theory is a broad theory of motivation in work organizations that maintains the predictions of cognitive evaluation theory but also recognizes the limitations of the theory, such as organizational conditions under which predictions do not apply or are less relevant in real-world settings, which cognitive evaluation theory fails to recognize. The theory differentiates between various types of motivational states, distinguishes the organizational conditions where extrinsic rewards are more effective than intrinsic rewards, examines individual differences in orientation toward intrinsic versus extrinsic motivation and discusses managerial behavior that can enhance intrinsic motivation. Findings from the Deci et al. (1989) study have supported self-determination theory as an approach to work motivation by showing how managers can impact the work attitudes of their employees. The study reported that managerial autonomy support which included provision of options, giving relevant information in a non-autonomous way, acknowledging subordinates' perspectives and cultivating self-initiation resulted in employees having more positive work-related attitudes such as higher level of job satisfaction and increased level of trust in corporate management.

Controversy
 The overjustification effect is controversial because it challenges previous findings in psychology on the general effectiveness of reinforcement on increasing behavior, and also the widespread practice of using incentives in the classroom. These findings fail to account for situations whereby the nature of activities differ, such as in cases where the initial level of intrinsic interest in the activity is very low, introducing extrinsic contingencies may be essential for producing involvement. These conclusions were challenged in a separate meta-analysis which found that tangible rewards offered for outperforming others and for performing uninteresting tasks (in which intrinsic motivation is low) lead to increased intrinsic motivation, and stated that the detrimental effects of rewards on motivation only occur in a specific, restricted set of conditions that could be easily avoided. This set of analyses included both high-interest and low-interest tasks, whereas the original meta-analyses conducted by Deci and colleagues (1999) restricted analyses to tasks in which participants initially had high interest. In fact, a 2001 meta-analysis showed that rewards can increase intrinsic motivation for tasks that initially hold little intrinsic interest.

Also, according to Eisenberger and Cameron, claimed negative effects of extrinsic rewards on task interest derived from the Deci study (1971) do not take into consideration that conditions manufactured in laboratory settings that produce these effects are not true reflections of situations in the real world. For example, in the Deci study the incentive was provided for one session and was then arbitrarily withdrawn in the next and such incentive plans do not exist in the real world. Also, the reduced intrinsic interest seen in subjects may be explained by a negative reaction when the reward was withheld.
Eisenberger and his colleges also claimed that the validity of the dependent measure is highly questionable in the Deci study. Laboratory results that used the amount of free time spend on the task as the dependent measure are shown to be far weaker than when self reports are used for these measures. The Deci study gives far less weight to self reports, however self-reports about subjects' level of internal motivation seem to be a more direct measure of the psychological state of interest.

Considerable research has also shown that rewards tend to enhance feelings of competence and autonomy and high standards, pressure and competitiveness are able to increase these effects. For example, employees view earning incentives as enjoyable rather than a dreaded tool of management control. These findings are in contrast with the psychological mechanism for effects that Deci and his colleges had claimed in the past. Also in the past 30 years, notable academic reviews of rewards have confirmed that monetary incentives have shown to significantly increase performance.
Additionally, some activities require a significant level of mastery or engagement before its attractiveness becomes apparent to an individual, in such cases external incentives may be useful to build individuals up to that level. Token economy programs represent one example in which there is evidence showing that such programs have successfully implemented extrinsic rewards to increase interest in certain broad classes of activities.

There are also differences in effect among the different age groups. According to Deci et al. (1999), the negative effects extrinsic contingencies have on intrinsic motivation seem to be more severe for children than college students. One possible explanation is that college students have greater cognitive capacity, enabling them to better separate informational and controlling aspects of rewards. Hence they are able to interpret rewards as indicators of effective performance rather than controlling their behavior, which causes them to operate with performance-goal orientations. It is therefore speculated that such differences are far greater between children and employed workers.

A rebuttal defended the original findings, concluding that this analysis by Cameron (2001) was flawed and that Cameron's inclusion of boring tasks in analyzing potential overjustification effects made little theoretical or practical sense. This rebuttal argued that cognitive evaluation theory is the most consistent structure for explaining the effects of rewards on intrinsic motivation, pointing to several other papers that have supported the theory.

Applications

Education
Findings from the Lepper et al.'s (1973) study suggest that presenting these extrinsic rewards poses central problems in the schooling system in that it fails to preserve the intrinsic interest in learning and exploration that a child may seem to possess during his initial phase in school. This also has severe ramifications on the education system, as it seems to almost undermine children's spontaneous interest in the process of learning itself, instead their motivation is driven by these extrinsic rewards. Research in this area suggests that parents and educators should rely on intrinsic motivation and preserve feelings of autonomy and competence as much as possible. When the task is unattractive and intrinsic motivation is insufficient (e.g., household chores), then extrinsic rewards are useful to provide incentives for behavior.

School programs that provide money or prizes for reading books have been criticized for their potential to reduce intrinsic motivation by overjustification. However, a study of the Pizza Hut program, Book It!, found that participation in the program neither increased nor decreased reading motivation. Although motivating students to read by rewarding them may undermine their interest in reading, it may also encourage the reading skills necessary for developing an interest in reading.

Workplace
Cognitive evaluation theory further predicts the different types of rewards that will exert different effects. According to the theory, task non-contingent rewards like benefits that are based on things other than performance, such as employment that do not consist any information regarding autonomy and competence, will have no effect on intrinsic motivation. Task contingent rewards on the other hand like salary which are awarded for performing or completing a task, will be experienced as controlling and hence will have a negative effect on intrinsic motivation. The study conducted by Deckop and Cirka (2000) reported that introducing merit pay programs in a non-profit organization led to decreased feelings of autonomy and intrinsic motivation, indicating that rewards can undermine intrinsic motivation in work settings.

Performance contingent rewards like monetary incentives that are given for good performance or meeting a certain standard will be experienced as highly controlling hence decreasing intrinsic motivation. The Shirom, Westman, and Melamed (1999) study found that pay-for-performance plans resulted in lower well being in blue-collar workers, and this was especially evident for those who felt that their jobs were monotonous. However, in certain cases where the reward also conveys information about competence that will in turn reduce the negative effect.

Gamification
The term gamification refers to the application of game design elements to non-game contexts in order to drive participation, often with the goal of encouraging greater engagement with the non-game context by providing symbolic rewards such as points, badges, or virtual currency. However, a number of academics and other critics have expressed concern that these rewards may backfire via the overjustification effect. Drawing directly on self-determination theory, these critics of gamification express concerns that gamified contexts such as foursquare might provide expected rewards for activities that do not adequately meet self-determination theory's three innate needs for intrinsic motivation—relatedness, autonomy, and competence—and therefore reduce intrinsic interest in those activities.

Crowdsourcing
Websites that rely on user-generated content sometimes offer monetary rewards for contributions, but these may cause the contributors to succumb to the overjustification effect and stop contributing. For example, Amazon Mechanical Turk allows the creator of a task to offer a monetary reward, but a survey of 431 Mechanical Turk participants showed that they are driven more by intrinsic motivations than a desire for the usually meager monetary compensation. The overjustification effect was also considered in a study on how to maximize contributions when crowdsourcing creative endeavors.

Volunteering
Empirical evidence shows that expected financial rewards "crowd out" intrinsic motivation, while the size of the monetary reward simultaneously provides extrinsic motivation. If the size of the monetary reward is not large enough to compensate for the loss of intrinsic motivation, overall engagement can decline. A survey data-set revealed that small financial payments reduced volunteer hours among Swiss citizens, and that the median financial reward provided to these volunteers caused them to work less than volunteers who were not given any payment.

Sports
The overjustification effect has also been linked to professional sports. The performance of numerous athletes has diminished following the signing of a lucrative, multimillion-dollar contract. Some notable professional athletes whose performances have diminished following a large contract include Alex Rodriguez (MLB), Albert Pujols (MLB), Wayne Rooney (Premier League) and Albert Haynesworth (NFL).

See also
 Attribution theory
 Candle problem
 Cognitive evaluation theory
 Motivation crowding theory
 Reinforcement
 Self-determination theory
 Self-perception
 Social psychology

References

Further reading
 Deci, E.L. (1995). Why we do what we do: The dynamics of personal autonomy. New York: G. P. Putnam's Sons.
 Kohn, A. (2005). Unconditional parenting: Moving from rewards and punishments to love and reason. New York: Atria Books.
 Pink, D.H. (2009). Drive: The surprising truth about what motivates us. Riverhead.

Cognitive biases
Educational psychology
Motivation